Dean Gerard Winters (born July 20, 1964) is an American actor. He is known for his role as Ryan O'Reily on the HBO prison drama Oz and had roles in TV series Rescue Me, 30 Rock, Sex and the City and Law & Order: Special Victims Unit, as well as portraying "Mayhem" in a series of Allstate Insurance commercials. He co-starred in one season of the CBS Network cop drama series Battle Creek and had a recurring role as “The Vulture” on the comedy series Brooklyn Nine-Nine.

Early life
Dean Gerard Winters was born in New York City on July 20, 1964. He was raised on Long Island. He is of Irish and Italian descent, and speaks fluent Italian. He has two brothers, actor Scott and writer Bradford, and a sister, Blair. Winters spent his teenage years in Scottsdale, Arizona. He attended Chaparral High School and graduated from Brophy College Preparatory, a Jesuit school in Phoenix, in 1982, and from Colorado College in 1986.

Career
Winters has appeared in two of the Law & Order television series: Law & Order: Special Victims Unit, where he was a regular in the first season, and as a guest star in the Law & Order: Criminal Intent episode "Purgatory". He also made an appearance in Season 2 of the television series Sex and the City as John McFadden. More than ten years after his final appearance on SVU, he again portrayed Detective Brian Cassidy in the 13th-season finale "Rhodium Nights", became a recurring character in the 14th season and, in the 15th season, also became Captain Olivia Benson's love interest. He has also made guest appearances on Homicide: Life on the Street, Third Watch, NYPD Blue, CSI: Miami and as Dennis Duffy in 30 Rock as well as previously having an accompanying role in Rescue Me.

He starred in the 1999 romantic comedy Undercover Angel with Yasmine Bleeth and the 2002 direct-to-video horror film Hellraiser: Hellseeker. He played Tom in PS, I Love You. Winters played Detective Sam Tyler's father in the US version of Life On Mars. He also played Charley Dixon, Sarah Connor's love interest, in Terminator: The Sarah Connor Chronicles.

Winters performed stand-up comedy at Catch a Rising Star, The Comic Strip, and the Comedy Cellar alongside notable comedians Jerry Seinfeld, Paul Reiser, and Chris Rock. An HBO comedy special led him to the role he portrayed on OZ, the HBO-produced prison drama.

Winters was cast in the ABC drama pilot Happy Town, from the creators of October Road, but was replaced by Steven Weber after shooting the pilot.

Winters was away from acting until 2010, when Tina Fey brought him back to 30 Rock.  Also that year, Winters was introduced as "Mayhem", a recurring character in a television and radio advertising campaign for Allstate Insurance created by the advertising agency Leo Burnett Chicago. In 2019, Fey joined Winters in a series of "Mayhem" commercials.

Winters played Avi in John Wick. Winters co-starred in one season of the CBS Network cop drama series Battle Creek, playing a small-town police force detective opposite Josh Duhamel, the FBI resident agent assigned to the town. The series was canceled in May 2015. Most recently, he reprised his role on Brooklyn Nine-Nine as The Vulture and had a supporting role as a divorce attorney on the HBO series Divorce. In 2018, he was cast as Mr. Town in the second season of Starz American Gods.

Health
In June 2009, Winters contracted a bacterial infection and collapsed upon arrival at his doctor's office. While being transported across Central Park in an ambulance, he went into cardiac arrest for over two minutes. Paramedics were able to revive him and he was hospitalized in intensive care for three weeks. Over the course of the next year, he developed gangrene, requiring the amputation of two toes and half of one thumb, and ten subsequent operations including a skin graft.

Filmography

Film

Television

References

External links 

1964 births
Living people
20th-century American male actors
21st-century American male actors
American amputees
American male film actors
American male television actors
American people of Irish descent
American people of Italian descent
Colorado College alumni
Male actors from New York City
Male actors from Scottsdale, Arizona